Pathirakali Amman Temple – Pathirakali Ambal Kovil – or the Kali Kovil, Trincomalee is a Hindu temple dedicated to the goddess Bhadrakali, a form of the goddess Kali Amman in Trincomalee, Eastern Province, Sri Lanka. The Kali temple of the ancient Trincomalee Koneswaram Temple Compounds, a large complex of connected shrines in the Trincomalee Konesar Malai area, the temple is located close to the Trincomalee Hindu College.

Made in classical Dravidian architecture, the Kovil is located just beyond the Konesar Road Esplanade before the entrance to Konamamalai (Swami Rock). Proximal to the ancient Koneswaram temple, both ancient temples share functions during Ther Thiruvillah Festival procession and the Back Bay Sea (Theertham Karatkarai).

Pathirakali Amman temple has attracted pilgrims from before the 11th century CE. King Rajendra Chola I expanded the shrine significantly during his reign, an inscription he left detailing this is displayed on the premises.

The temple is mentioned in the book Birds of Prey (1997) by Wilbur Smith, set in the 1660s.

See also
Thillai Kali Temple, Chidambaram
Koneswaram temple, Trincomalee

References

Hindu temples in Trincomalee District
Religious buildings and structures in Trincomalee
Kali temples